La Covatilla is a ski resort in the Central System of the Province of Salamanca, in Castile and León, Spain. The resort is in the municipality of La Hoya.

Cycling
The resort is known for having held a stage finish, on several occasions, of the Vuelta a España.

References

External links

Official site

Ski areas and resorts in Spain
Populated places in the Province of Salamanca